Catherine (Cathi) Best is an American psycholinguist and Chair in Psycholinguistic Research at Western Sydney University. She is known for her works on speech perception and production.

References

Phonologists
Living people
Year of birth missing (living people)
Women linguists
Linguists from the United States
Academic staff of Western Sydney University
Michigan State University alumni
Psycholinguists
Wesleyan University faculty
Columbia University faculty
Speech perception researchers
Speech production researchers
American women psychologists